The 2008 St Albans City and District Council election took place on 1 May 2008 to elect members of St Albans District Council in Hertfordshire, England. One third of the council was up for election and the Liberal Democrats gained overall control of the council from no overall control.

After the election, the composition of the council was:
Liberal Democrats 30
Conservative 22
Labour 5
Independent 1

Background
Before the election the Liberal Democrats had 29 seats, compared to 19 for the Conservatives, 8 for Labour and there were 2 Independents. 18 of the 20 wards were contested in 2008, with only Colney Heath and Sandridge wards not having an election. Each of the Liberal Democrat, Conservative, Labour and Green parties contested every seat, apart from in Redbourn where the Liberal Democrats did not put up a candidate against the sitting independent councillor Tony Swendell.

3 Liberal Democrat councillors, Brian Peyton, Brian Sinfield and Jenny Stroud, and 2 Conservative councillors, Clare Ellis and Liz Stevenson, stood down at the election. Independent, former Conservative, councillor John Newman also did not defend his seat in Harpenden West after moving to Dorset.

Election result
The Liberal Democrats regained an overall majority of 2 on the council with 30 councillors, after making a net gain of one seat. They gained seats in Batchwood, Sopwell and Verulam wards, but lost Harpenden East and Wheathampstead to the Conservatives, who increased to 22 seats on the council. The Labour party lost all of the seats they had been defending, including London Colney to the Conservatives, to fall to 5 seats on the council, while independent Tony Swendell held his seat in Redbourn. Labour blamed their defeats on voters protesting against the national Labour government. Overall turnout was 42.5%, a drop from 43.6% at the 2007 election.

Following the election the national Liberal Democrat leader Nick Clegg came to St Albans to celebrate the results.

Ward results

By-elections between 2008 and 2010
A by-election was held in Harpenden South on 4 June 2009 after Conservative councillor Paul Foster resigned from the council. The seat was held for the Conservatives by Brian Ellis with a majority of 899 votes over the Labour Party.

References

2008
2008 English local elections
2000s in Hertfordshire